Petrarca Calcio a Cinque is an Italian futsal club based in Padua, Italy.

History
The club was founded in 1989. From 1997 to 2003 the Petrarca played in Serie A.

Notable players
 Marco Ercolessi

Notable coaches
 Jesús Velasco

External links
Official Website

Futsal clubs in Italy
1989 establishments in Italy